Amor à Vida (English: Trail of Lies) is a Brazilian telenovela created by Walcyr Carrasco. It premiered on 20 May 2013 on TV Globo in the 9 pm timeslot and ended on 31 January 2014. It is directed by Wolf Maya and Mauro Mendonça Filho.

Starring Paolla Oliveira, Malvino Salvador, Mateus Solano, Vanessa Giácomo, Susana Vieira, Antônio Fagundes, Juliano Cazarré, Elizabeth Savalla, Bárbara Paz, José Wilker among others.

Plot

First phase
2001 – The story revolves around a wealthy family's struggles for control of the renowned San Magno Hospital, in São Paulo. The hospital belongs to the Khoury family, headed by general practitioner César Khoury (Antonio Fagundes). Most of the family are doctors: Caesar's wife, Pilar (Susana Vieira), is a retired dermatologist and Paloma (Paolla Oliveira), the couple's youngest daughter, has just been accepted to a college to study medicine after several unsuccessful attempts in other areas. Only Felix (Mateus Solano), the eldest son, shows no motivation to follow the same career, but he does not lack ambition. Since he could not be a doctor, Felix studied administration so he could work on the hospital board and plans to one day head the family business. Felix is gay, but married a stylist, Edith (Bárbara Paz), to keep up appearances.

To commemorate Paloma's acceptance into college, the family travels to Machu Picchu in Peru, where Paloma meets Ninho (Juliano Cazarré). Ninho is a backpacker who adopts a lifestyle free of rules and Paloma falls in love with him. Tired of fighting with her mother, she decides to leave the family and college to live with Ninho. The couple spends about a year hitchhiking aimlessly around South America, living in intense passion, until Paloma discovers she is pregnant. Without money and thinking about the baby's future, she decides to return to her parents' home in São Paulo, and convinces Ninho to go with her.

To pay for the ticket, Ninho decides to smuggle drugs during the trip. However, Ninho is detained at the airport in Bolivia after being found with drugs on his body. Paloma flies back to São Paulo alone and trusts her brother to help her face their family. Felix convinces his sister that it would be better to keep her pregnancy a secret. Back in her parents' house, Felix's wife, Edith, helps Paloma disguise her pregnancy by wearing baggy clothes to avoid raising suspicion. Near the end of Paloma's pregnancy, Ninho leaves prison and goes to São Paulo. Felix pretends to help the couple, but really he plans to get rid of them and become the sole heir of the family. Paloma decides to leave home to be with Ninho, but is caught by her parents who are shocked to realize that she is expecting a baby. After arguing with her mother, Paloma leaves and spends the night in a bar with Ninho. After a lot of drinking to celebrate his release from jail, Ninho has a nasty argument with Paloma and says he does not want to start a family. Very disappointed, Paloma sends him away. In her state of anxiety Paloma goes into premature labor, and ends up giving birth to a girl in the bathroom of the bar with the help of bar patron Marcia (Elizabeth Savalla), a former "chacrete" (TV dancer). Felix, who had gone in search of his sister, arrives at the bar to find Paloma unconscious in the bathroom with no one but her newborn daughter at her side. Marcia had called an ambulance and left for fear of being arrested.

Feeling threatened by the infant heir of the Khoury family, Felix kidnaps the child and leaves her in a dumpster in an alley. When she awakes, Paloma cannot find the baby and is convinced that her daughter was mysteriously stolen without a trace. Paloma's path will soon intersect with Bruno (Malvino Salvador), a kind man who just lost his wife and his newborn son due to complications in childbirth. While distressed by that incident, and wandering the streets, Bruno finds Paloma's daughter in a dumpster after he hears her crying. Bruno sees the incident as a divine sign, a chance for him to start a new life, and takes the baby girl home. Bruno receives help from his mother, a nurse named Ordália (Eliane Giardini), who works at the San Magno hospital, as well as an ob/gyn named Glauce (Leona Cavalli). Glauce helps Bruno keep the baby without having to go through the formal adoption process. He asks Glauce to change the hospital record to report that his wife gave birth to two children: a boy, who died, and a surviving girl. In love with Bruno, Glauce does what he asks, risking her career. A pact is made between Bruno, Ordália, and Glauce that this secret will never be revealed.

Second phase
2013 – 12 years have passed, and Paloma, after ending her relationship with Ninho, apologizes to her parents and decides to follow a medical career working as a pediatrician at her father's hospital. She chooses pediatrics so that she can work with kids to compensate for the loss of her daughter, whom she believes is still alive somewhere. What Paloma does not realize is that her missing daughter is one of her most beloved patients: Paula (Klara Castanho), a very sweet and smart girl. Paloma has always had a very strong and affectionate bond with Paula, regardless of the fact that Paula is actually Paloma's daughter, and her closeness to Paula forces her to cross paths with Bruno, Paula's father. Paloma and Bruno, who had met years earlier when Paloma had admitted and nursed Paulinha unaware that she was really her daughter. The two separate, but before they realize, they are living together again. Paulinha especially approves of the relationship because she loves Paloma.

United by fate, Bruno, Paloma and Paula are happy until Ninho returns to Brazil determined to regain his relationship with Paloma. Fate holds moments of joy and sadness, revelations and dilemmas. At one point, Paula suffers a serious illness and blood tests reveal that Paloma is the only one who can donate an organ, due to the extremely close similarity of their blood. Suspicious, Paloma secretly orders a DNA test and discovers that Paula is her daughter. She becomes convinced that Bruno stole her daughter twelve years earlier, and their once-close relationship turns to hate. With Ninho, Paloma decides to take Bruno to court to regain custody of Paula. What Paloma cannot imagine is that the real culprit for all this is her brother, Felix, who now, in addition to Paloma, has another an obstacle in his path: Paulinha. Felix is aided by Glauce, who previously in love with Bruno, is happy to hurt Paloma in any way possible. Bruno hires lawyer Silvia (Carol Castro) to defend him.

In addition, the marriage of Cesar and Pilar is threatened by the arrival of the new medical secretary, Aline (Vanessa Giacomo), a beautiful young woman with a mysterious past who will do anything to seduce the head of the hospital and gain revenge on César, who she believes is responsible for the tragedies in her young life.

Side plots

Also depicted is the gay couple, Niko (Thiago Fragoso) and Eron (Marcello Antony), who plan to have a child through artificial insemination. They ask Niko's close friend Amarilys (Danielle Winits) to be their surrogate, but she falls in love with Eron creating a love triangle that threatens to ruin Niko and Eron's relationship.

Cast

Special appearances
Neymar
Alexandre Pato
Luciano Huck
Gustavo Borges
Gusttavo Lima
Vitor Belfort
Valesca Popozuda
Anitta
Rita Cadillac

New characters
 As some had to leave the plot, other players have entered unusually in it the Walcyr Carrasco invitation. This was the case of Carol Castro, who entered the plot on July 5, in the Sílvia's skin, which was to be just a cameo that form a love triangle between the protagonists. However, the character ended up staying in the plot with another function, to interfere in the relationship of Patricia and Michel, as it turns out to be the doctor's wife. Throughout the novel also discovers that her character has to remove a breast, generating over a controversial subject in the plot, breast cancer. Already Márcio Garcia, who attended the first chapters as the adulterous husband of Patricia, returned in the middle of the novel to also separate his ex-fiancée of Michel.
 Carlos Machado entered the plot on 7 August as the millionaire Ignácio. It would just be a cameo, but the character returned to stay until the end of the plot, with your mother Eudóxia, played by Angela Rabelo.
 Another that comes in the middle of the plot is José Wilker, playing the doctor Herbert Marques, César's replacement in the position of clinical director of the hospital San Magno. The character is also a former case with Ordália, and alleged biological father of Gina. The premiere of the actor in the plot happened in the chapter on 26 September 2013. That was the last role of the actor, who died on April 4, 2014.
 Sophia Abrahão entered in the plot in October 2 as Natasha, daughter of Lídia (Angela Rebello) with Nicole's father (Marina Ruy Barbosa), who lived hidden abroad. She will be part of Lídia (Angela Rebello) and Rogério plan (Daniel Rocha), which begins to be put in place after the girl back to the doctor in the United States, to get back at Leila (Fernanda Machado) and Thales (Ricardo Tozzi) for what they did with Nicole (Marina Ruy Barbosa).
 Sidney Sampaio, who was already cast in the predecessor Salve Jorge, just mending work to get in the middle of Amor à Vida plot as the evangelical Elias, who makes romantic couple with Gina (Carolina Kasting). The actor entered the plot in the chapter 7 November 2013.
 Francisco Cuoco also entered in the last weeks of the novel as the farmer Rubão, husband of Eudóxia and father of Ignácio. The first scenes of the actor aired on January 3, 2014.

Soundtracks 
 National
Cover: Paolla Oliveira

 International
Cover: Mateus Solano

Ratings 

In the premiere episode, Amor à Vida received a viewership rating of 35 points which is equivalent to 2.16 million households. In Florianópolis, it was estimated that about 3,5 million viewers have watched the pilot of the novel, with 67% audience share, recording 42.02 points in IBOPE. In its first week, the show garnered an average viewership of 34.2 points compared to its predecessor, Salve Jorge which had 32.7 points at (then) the same period.
On the episode aired on 11 July 2013, the show registered 39 points breaking record for Walcyr Carrasco's novelas. On the episode aired on 1 August, Amor à Vida recorded 39 points taking into account that its one of the most controversial episodes where Edith (Barbara Paz) reveals to the Khoury's about Felix (Mateus Solano) sexuality. On the 8 August, the episode that had the wedding and death of Nicole (Marina Ruy Barbosa), the telenovela recorded a rating of 44 points in Rio de Janeiro and 38 points in São Paulo according to IBOPE. 
On the great revelation that Félix (Mateus Solano) abandoned Paloma's (Paolla Oliveira) daughter in a trash bin peaked at 45 points in Greater São Paulo.
It became the most watched program of Brazilian television in the 2013–14 season. In the chapter on 27 January 2014, which recorded 49.4 points in the National IBOPE, which equates to 10.7 million homes and approximately 31.6 million viewers.
In the ultimate episodes Amor à Vida registered 47 points in Greater São Paulo on 28 January, 42 points on 29 January. On its penultimate episode, Amor à Vida recorded 48 points with IBOPE, comparing it to Avenida Brasil which registered 49 points.
In the last episode aired on 31 January 2014, the telenovela registered a viewership rating of 48 points.

Notes

Awards and nominations

References

External links
  
 

2013 Brazilian television series debuts
2014 Brazilian television series endings
2013 telenovelas
TV Globo telenovelas
Brazilian telenovelas
Television shows set in Peru
Brazilian LGBT-related television shows
Telenovelas by Walcyr Carrasco
Gay-related television shows
Portuguese-language telenovelas
2010s LGBT-related drama television series
Child abduction in television